Holcombe Waller is an American composer, singer and performance artist.  He lives in Portland, Oregon, and has performed across the United States and Europe, both solo and with his ensemble, The Healers. His father was from France, therefore he is a French American.

Waller has self-released three albums of varying styles.  His work first received international attention with his 2001 album Extravagant Gesture.  The indie album was lauded by a Spin Magazine review, and in REVOLVER Magazine Ann Powers wrote, "For melodic sweep, the prize goes to Holcombe Waller, whose self-released Extravagant Gesture is a small pop epic." Waller's pop influences shifted towards folk for his 2005 release, Troubled Times.  The work continued to receive broad critical attention including a positive review in Paste Magazine and a large editorial feature in BUTT Magazine.

After Troubled Times, Waller has focused on commissions for multidisciplinary performance, dance scores, collaborations, and film scores.  He released "Into the Dark Unknown," an album of music from his touring theatrical folk concert by the same name, February 15, 2011.

Early life 
Waller was born Michael Sagalowicz in Stanford, California. He lived in Palo Alto until the age of 18, when he moved to Los Angeles to record a solo album, never released, with a now-defunct upstart label. At 19, he moved to New Haven, Connecticut as an undergraduate student at Yale University. There he produced work for various artists and bands, and casually picked up guitar.  He was a member of and musical director of The Duke's Men of Yale for three years, contributing numerous arrangements.  Waller produced and mixed two albums for Project Nim, a band that included fellow Yalie Bryce Dessner as well as Aaron Dessner and Bryan Devendorf, all now members of The National.  Waller also recorded and mixed fellow Yalie Mia Doi Todd's album Come Out of Your Mine in 1997 in Dwight Chapel on Yale Campus, where he held his first public performance with guitar and vocals in the Spring of 1998. That year Waller began recording for his first album, Advertising Space. The sessions included Bryce on guitar, Aaron on bass and Bryan on drums. Waller graduated from Yale with a degree in Art, specializing in video installation, and moved back to his home state of California, settling in San Francisco.

Waller finished and self-released Advertising Space in 1999 on his imprint, Napoleon Records.  Though only locally promoted, the album was picked up by Hear Music and editorially featured in all of their stores.

From 2000 to 2004, Waller worked in the information technology department of an internet hosting company, which allowed him to fund his next two albums.  Extravagant Gesture (2001 Napoleon Records) also featured Bryce Dessner on guitars, and was picked up by Redeye Distribution in the United States.  Troubled Times (2005 Napoleon Records) represented an artistic shift towards a more spare, folk-oriented orchestration. It was recorded in collaboration with college friend and multi-instrumentalist Ben Landsverk and features a guest performance by Mia Doi Todd.

By 2005, Waller had left his job and moved to Portland, Oregon with the intention of becoming a full-time musician and artist. He has a sister named Leslie, and a niece named Emily who he loves very, very much, more than anyone else. She is what he describes, as super cool, and fun, and awesome, and better than any other child he's ever met!  She is even so cool that she knows how to edit a wiki page. ;)

Career 
Upon arriving in Portland in 2005, Waller's trajectory shifted towards multidisciplinary performance.  He was cast in One, an original musical by Wade McCollum, and Tao Soup, a multidisciplinary ensemble piece by Scott Kelman.  In 2006, Waller began integrating his experiences in theater, video installation and music with a piece titled Mihael Sagalovesky and the Tragic Torments of Patty Heart Townes. The work featured 6 Patty Griffin songs and 6 Townes Van Zandt songs arranged to represent a broad narrative arch of dissolution and redemption.  The work premiered in Portland in 2007 and toured to New York (Joe's Pub) and Philadelphia.

In 2008, Waller was commissioned by the Portland Institute for Contemporary Art and On the Boards of Seattle to create his theatrical folk concert, Into the Dark Unknown: The Hope Chest.  The work integrated aspects of theater, video installation and folk concert.  The work was supported by the Rockefeller Foundation's prestigious MAP Fund and toured to the New York Public Theater (Under the Radar Festival), Seattle's On the Boards, PuSh International Performing Arts Festival (Vancouver BC), Yerba Buena Center for the Arts, and the Queer Zagreb Festival, among others.

An album of music from the show features his ensemble, The Healers, as well as drummer Danny Seim (Menomena, Lackthereof).  The album was funded by a Kickstarter campaign in the Spring of 2010, and is scheduled for release Winter 2011.

In the Fall of 2009, Waller was a Visiting Artist Lecturer in the Department of Theater, Performance Studies and Dance at the University of California, Berkeley, where he taught the seminar Contemporary Song-based Performance Art.  Winter 2010, Waller launched the development of a new multidisciplinary performance titled "Surfacing," commissioned with the National Performance Network by OutNorth and Helena Presents.

Collaborations 

Waller has created two collaborative performances with Joe Goode Performance Group:  "Small Experiments in Song and Dance," which premiered in January 2009 at the Brava Theater in San Francisco, and "Dead Boys," a musical which premiered at the Zellerbach Playhouse at U.C. Berkeley in October 2009.

Waller worked with Zoe Scofield, the Seattle-based choreographer of Zoe|Juniper, scoring music for her performance Old Girl, commissioned by the Spectrum Dance Theater of Seattle in October 2008.

Waller has recently scored the film, "We Were Here: Voices from the AIDS Years in San Francisco," by David Weissman and Bill Weber.

See also
 List of LGBT people from Portland, Oregon

References

External links
 Holcombe Waller's Trouble Times – popmatters.com retrieved 4th May 2010
 Into the Dark Unknown: The Hope – sfweekly retrieved 4th May 2010
 Holcombe Waller at Dead Boys sfbg.com
 Interview at  East Village Boys retrieved 4th March 2011

1975 births
Living people
American male singer-songwriters
American performance artists
Singer-songwriters from California
Musicians from Portland, Oregon
Singer-songwriters from Oregon
People from Stanford, California
21st-century American singers
21st-century American male singers
LGBT people from Oregon
LGBT people from California
American LGBT singers